Pakistan Railways FC are a Pakistani football club from Lahore who play in the Pakistan Premier League and play at the Railway Stadium. Nicknamed the Railwaymen, they are one of the oldest football clubs in Pakistan and were created by the railway workers on the Pakistan Railway.

History
In 1969, they beat Karachi to win the first of their two national titles. The second was in 1984, when pushed WAPDA FC into second. They also were runners-up eight times. In 2005, they returned to the top flight when they won the Pakistan Football Federation League. They were relegated from Pakistan Premier League after two years in 2007. Chaudhary Asghar was Pakistan Railways football coach till that time. The coaching was then passed to Muhammad Rasheed, the ex-national player and Pakistan Railways legend who scored the only goal in the National Championship 1984 final.

Railways have again qualified in the premier league 2014 by winning their departmental leg of the Pakistan Football Federation League 2013.

Honours

Domestic

Leagues 
 National Football League
 Winners (2): 1969–70, 1984–85

 Football Federation League
 Winners (2): 2005–06, 2013–14

Asian 
 Aga Khan Gold Cup
 Winners (1): 1963

References

External links
 Pakistan Railways site

Football clubs in Pakistan
1950 establishments in Pakistan
Association football clubs established in 1950
Railway association football clubs in Pakistan
Pakistan Railways sports
Football in Lahore